Database tables and indexes may be stored on disk in one of a number of forms, including ordered/unordered flat files, ISAM, heap files, hash buckets, or B+ trees. Each form has its own particular advantages and disadvantages. The most commonly used forms are B-trees and ISAM. Such forms or structures are one aspect of the overall schema used by a database engine to store information.

Unordered

Unordered storage typically stores the records in the order they are inserted. Such storage offers good insertion efficiency, but inefficient retrieval times.

Ordered

Ordered storage typically stores the records in order and may have to rearrange or increase the file size when a new record is inserted, resulting in lower insertion efficiency.

Structured files

Heap files

Heap files are lists of unordered records of variable size. Although sharing a similar name, heap files are widely different from in-memory heaps. In-memory heaps are ordered, as opposed to heap files.

 Simplest and most basic method
 insert efficient, with new records added at the end of the file, providing chronological order
 retrieval efficient when the handle to the memory is the address of the memory
 search inefficient, as searching has to be linear
 deletion is accomplished by marking selected records as "deleted"
 requires periodic reorganization if file is very volatile (changed frequently)
 Advantages
 efficient for bulk loading data
 efficient for relatively small relations as indexing overheads are avoided
 efficient when retrievals involve large proportion of stored records
 Disadvantages
 not efficient for selective retrieval using key values, especially if large
 sorting may be time-consuming
 not suitable for volatile tables

Hash buckets

 Hash functions calculate the address of the page in which the record is to be stored based on one or more fields in the record
 hashing functions chosen to ensure that addresses are spread evenly across the address space
 ‘occupancy’ is generally 40% to 60% of the total file size
 unique address not guaranteed so collision detection and collision resolution mechanisms are required
 Open addressing
 Chained/unchained overflow
 Pros and cons
 efficient for exact matches on key field
 not suitable for range retrieval, which requires sequential storage
 calculates where the record is stored based on fields in the record
 hash functions ensure even spread of data
 collisions are possible, so collision detection and restoration is required

B+ trees

These are the most commonly used in practice.
 Time taken to access any record is the same because the same number of nodes is searched
 Index is a full index so data file does not have to be ordered
 Pros and cons
 versatile data structure – sequential as well as random access
 access is fast
 supports exact, range, part key and pattern matches efficiently.
 volatile files are handled efficiently because index is dynamic – expands and contracts as table grows and shrinks
 less well suited to relatively stable files – in this case, ISAM is more efficient

Data orientation

Most conventional relational databases use "row-oriented" storage, meaning that all data associated with a given row is stored together. By contrast, column-oriented DBMS store all data from a given column together in order to more quickly serve data warehouse-style queries.  Correlation databases are similar to row-based databases, but apply a layer of indirection to map multiple instances of the same value to the same numerical identifier.

See also
 Database index
 ISAM

Databases
Database management systems
Database theory